Rustam Emomali (born 19 December 1987) is a Tajik politician who is the current Chairman of the National Assembly of Tajikistan, Mayor of Dushanbe and the eldest son of Emomali Rahmon, the long-standing authoritarian leader of Tajikistan. Emomali's father appointed Emomali as the mayor of Dushanbe when he was 29 years old.

Rustam Emomali is believed to be prepared by his father to succeed him as the leader of Tajikistan; he holds the title of the constitutionally designated successor to the presidency. He heads the anti-corruption agency in Tajikistan and the state's financial oversight agency. Despite not having served in the armed forces, he holds the rank of major general.

Early life and football career 
Rustam Emomali was born as Rustam Emomalievich Rahmonov (Tajik: Рустам Эмомалиевич Раҳмонов) in the district of Danghara, Kulob oblast (present-day Khatlon province) in Tajikistan, to parents Emomali Rahmon and Azizmo Asadullayeva. He graduated from the Tajik State National University with a specialist's degree in International Economic Relations and took courses with the Diplomatic Academy of the Russian Ministry of Foreign Affairs. In 2007, following his father's suit, he dropped the Russian-style patronymic and last name, adopting his father's first name, Emomali, as his new surname.

In 2007, Rustam Emomali co-founded the Dushanbe-based football club Istiklol and, during the next several years, he served as the club's captain and played for it as a striker. The club has won five national championships consecutively since 2011, owing at least partially to very favorable refereeing and other preferences. In 2011, Rustam Emomali was appointed deputy president of Tajikistan's Football Federation (TFT) and joined the International Relations Committee of the Olympic Council of Asia. In January 2012, the TFT named Rustam Emomali its new president. Following the appointment, he stopped playing for FC Istiklol and promised to cut all ties to the club. Starting in 2012, he served as a member of the FIFA Development Committee for two years. In 2016, the TFT reelected Rustam Emomali as its president for another four years.

He is known for his two expensive hobbies: car racing and collecting sports cars.

He is the first recipient of "Argali Conservation Achievement Award".

Political promotions 
After graduating from the university, Rustam Emomali enjoyed rapid career growth thanks to his status as a son of the country's president. In 2006, he was appointed a leading specialist at Tajikistan's Organization for Cooperation with the World Trade Organization. In 2009, he got a job as a leading specialist in the State Committee on Investments and State Property (SCISP) and was soon promoted to the position of a head of a department in the committee. During his work in the SCISP, he also served as an adviser to the committee. Also in 2009, Rustam Emomali was appointed a deputy head of the Youth Union, the Tajik successor to the Soviet-era Komsomol organization. Starting in 2009, Rustam Emomali began attending major international summits and meetings with foreign dignitaries in Tajikistan. In 2010, he became a member of the central executive committee of the People's Democratic Party of Tajikistan and was elected a member of the Dushanbe municipal parliament.

In February 2011, Emomali Rahmon appointed Rustam Emomali head of the anti-smuggling department in the Customs Service, the first in a number of senior law-enforcement positions that the Tajik president's son has held. Soon after the appointment, he was given the rank of major. In November 2013, Rustam Emomali was appointed head of the Customs Service. The appointment came with a new military rank, major general. In March 2015, president Emomali Rahmon appointed his son to head Tajikistan's principal anti-corruption agency, the State Agency For Financial Control and Measures Against Corruption. In January 2017, Rustam Emomali was appointed Mayor of Dushanbe, a key position, which is seen by some analysts as the next step to the top of the government.

Political succession speculations 
Rustam Emomali's rapid career growth and his appointments to a number of different senior government positions has fueled speculations that he was being prepared to succeed his father as the leader of Tajikistan. Rustam Emomali attends all key international summits in the country and accompanies his father during his frequent tours around the country. On 22 May 2016, a nationwide referendum approved a number of changes to the country's constitution. One of the key amendments reduced the minimum eligibility age for presidential candidates from 35 to 30, effectively enabling Rustam Emomali to succeed his father in office after 2017.

Personal life 
Rustam Emomali is the oldest son of Tajikistan's president, Emomali Rahmon. He has eight siblings, including a younger brother, Somon. He got married in 2009 to a daughter of a well-connected entrepreneur who owns a number of food-processing enterprises. The couple has three children, two sons and a daughter. Rustam's elder sister, Ozoda Rahmon, is the Presidential chief of staff and a former senator. One of his other sisters, Zarina Rahmon, was a deputy head of Orienbank, appointed in January 2017.

References 

1987 births
Living people
Chairmen of the National Assembly of Tajikistan
Tajikistani footballers
Children of national leaders
Mayors of Dushanbe
Association football forwards
People from Khatlon Region
FC Istiklol players
Tajik National University alumni